Deolus W. Husband (June 19, 1959 – November 13, 1989) was an American composer.

Biography
Husband was born in Raleigh, Mississippi.  He attended the University of Southern Mississippi for Bachelor's degree, graduating in 1981. At the Manhattan School of Music he studied composition with John Corigliano and Ludmila Ulehla, receiving his doctorate in 1987.

Husband's partner was Edwin Alexander, a bassoonist.

Legacy
Before he died, Husband became involved with the Estate Project for Artists With AIDS. After his death, Maury Newberger (Husband's representative at the Estate Project) set up The Deolus Husband Scholarship for Composition at the Manhattan School of Music.

Husband's manuscripts were donated by Newberger to the Music Division of the New York Public Library for the Performing Arts.

References

1959 births
1989 deaths
People from Raleigh, Mississippi
American male composers
Manhattan School of Music alumni
AIDS-related deaths in Mississippi
University of Southern Mississippi alumni
American LGBT musicians
LGBT people from Mississippi
20th-century American male musicians
20th-century American LGBT people